Dangerous Edge: A Life of Graham Greene is a biographical documentary film about Graham Greene, originally broadcast nationally in the US on PBS on March 29, 2013 and distributed internationally. It was directed by Thomas Patrick O'Connor and narrated by Derek Jacobi. Contributors and cast include Graham Greene himself, his wife Vivien Greene, Bernard Diederich, John le Carré, David Lodge, John Mortimer, Bill Nighy, John Perkins, Paul Theroux and biographers Richard Greene (no relation) and Norman Sherry.

References

External links
 
 Dangerous Edge at PBS

2013 television films
2013 films
American documentary television films
Graham Greene
2013 documentary films
Documentary films about writers